The Cook and the Chef is an Australian television series featuring cook Maggie Beer and chef Simon Bryant. The Cook and the Chef was screened on ABC1 and was filmed in the Barossa Valley, South Australia, with the first episode going to air on February 8, 2006.

In July 2009, Maggie and Simon announced they had decided to end the series after four years. The finale aired on 16 September 2009 with "Party" as the theme of the episode. Repeats of the show currently air on SBS Food.

Cast

Main
 Maggie Beer
 Simon Bryant

Guest
 Chris Abbot (1 episode, 2008)
 Peter Cundall (1 episode, 2008)
 Dominic Scarfo (1 episode, 2008)
 Rick Stein (1 episode, 2008)
 Tetsuya Wakuda (1 episode, 2009)

DVD Releases
The Cook and the Chef - The Four Seasons (8 Disc Box Set) - 7 November 2007

The Cook and the Chef - The Complete Series 2 (8 Disc Box Set) (BONUS Recipe Book) - 3 November 2009

The Cook and the Chef - The Complete Series 3 (8 Disc Box Set) (BONUS Note Book) - 31 March 2010

The Cook and the Chef - The Complete Series 4 (4 Disc Box Set) - 4 November 2010

See also
 List of Australian television series

References

External links
 

Australian cooking television series
Australian Broadcasting Corporation original programming
Television shows set in South Australia
2006 Australian television series debuts
2009 Australian television series endings